Gary Costello may refer to:

 Gary Costello (Family Affairs), a character on the British soap opera Family Affairs
 Gary Costello (musician) (died 2006), Australian jazz bassist